Myrcia hanoverensis is a species of plant in the family Myrtaceae. It is endemic to north-western Jamaica.  It is threatened by habitat loss.

References

hanoverensis
Endangered plants
Endemic flora of Jamaica
Taxonomy articles created by Polbot